The  singles Tournament at the Matrix Essentials Evert Cup took place between February 24 and March 1 on the outdoor hard courts of the Indian Wells Tennis Garden in Indian Wells, United States. Monica Seles won the title, defeating Conchita Martínez in the final.

Seeds

Draw

Finals

Top half

Section 1

Section 2

Bottom half

Section 3

Section 4

External links
 Main draw

Matrix Essentials Evert Cup - Singles